Zarin Tasnim Naumi (born 2 July 1996) is a Bangladeshi singer. She participated in the Bangladesh Television reality show Notun Kuri as a child. She has garnered nearly fourteen national and international awards in music. Later, her breakthrough came with the reality show Channel I Khude Gaanraj. She has sung in many hit films including Hero: The Superstar (2014), Most Welcome 2 (2014), Krishnopokkho (2016), Valobasha Emoni Hoy (2017), and on albums including "Tumi", "Tumi Hina", and "Milon" with Imran Mahmudul.

Early life
Naumi was born in Mymensingh, Bangladesh on 2 July 1996. She later moved to Dhaka. She completed her schooling and college at Cambrian College, Dhaka.

Career
Naumi began singing at the age of four. She learnd music from Anil Kumar Dhar. She sang the song "Meghla Akash" on Amir Newaz's album. She gained nationwide popularity when she participated in the Channel i Khude Gaanraj contest. She debuted with her first album Naumi in 2012. Later, she sang the theme song of ABC Radio and Dhaka FM. She sang some jingles and published several successful music videos. Naumi has sung in several films as well.

Discography

References

External links
 

Living people
1996 births
21st-century Bangladeshi women singers
21st-century Bangladeshi singers
Bangladeshi pop singers
People from Mymensingh District